To Kwa Peng is a village of in the Sai Kung North area of Tai Po District, Hong Kong.

Administration
To Kwa Peng is a recognized village under the New Territories Small House Policy.

References

External links
 Delineation of area of existing village To Kwa Peng (Sai Kung North) for election of resident representative (2019 to 2022)

Villages in Tai Po District, Hong Kong
Sai Kung North